The Andorra men's national 3x3 team is the 3x3 basketball team representing Andorra in international competitions, organized and run by the Andorran Basketball Federation.

Senior Competitions

Performance at World Championships

Performance at European Games

Performance at Europe Championships

See also 
 Andorra men's national 3x3 team

References

External links 
Andorra Basketball Federation website

Basketball
Women's national 3x3 basketball teams
Basketball in Andorra